Ann Smith Franklin (October 2, 1696 – April 16, 1763) was an American colonial newspaper printer and publisher. She inherited the business from her husband, James Franklin, brother of Benjamin Franklin. She published the Mintunt, printed an almanac series. She was the country’s first female newspaper editor, the first woman to write an almanac, and the first woman inducted into the University of Rhode Island's Journalism Hall of Fame.

Personal life
Ann Smith Franklin was married to James Franklin, a printer and the brother of Founding Father Benjamin Franklin.

They had five children including daughters Mary and Elizabeth, and son James Jr. (c.1730-1762). James Jr. attended Philadelphia Academy with his cousin William, Benjamin's son, before James Jr. was apprenticed in the printing trade to his uncle Benjamin. After a long illness, James died in Newport in 1735, leaving Ann a widow, aged 39, with three young children to support, one child having died earlier.

Career
In 1736, Ann petitioned the General Assembly of Rhode Island, seeking printing work in order to support her family.  She was awarded the contract, becoming the General Assembly's official printer to the colony, a position she held until she died. In this official capacity, she printed the colony's charter granted by Charles II of England. To supplement her income, she printed sermons for ministers, advertisements for merchants, as well as popular British novels. Ann's most notable work was compiling and publishing five editions of the Rhode Island Almanack, for the years 1737-1741.  In 1741, she began selling her brother-in-law Benjamin's almanac, Poor Richard's Almanack, and in 1745, she printed 500 copies of the Acts and Laws of Rhode Island as a folio edition, her largest commission.

Though a second child died young, Mary, Elizabeth and James Jr. worked in the family business.  The daughters performed typesetting while James Jr. ran the business, now called "Ann and James Franklin", with his mother.  During this time, however, some of Ann's imprints continued to bear the name "Widow Franklin".  In 1758, they published The Newport Mercury, Rhode Island's first newspaper.

Later years
As Ann grew older, she turned over many business responsibilities to James Jr. After the deaths of her remaining children, Ann, then age 65, returned to the printing press. She took on the printer Samuel Hall, who had been her son-in-law, as her business partner in 1761, forming "Franklin & Hall". Under this imprint, they printed a folio of Rhode Island schedules.

Ann Smith Franklin died in 1763 and was buried in the Newport Common Burying Ground and Island Cemetery.

Posthumous awards
 Journalism Hall of Fame, University of Rhode Island
 Yankee Quill Award, 2008
 Rhode Island Heritage Hall of Fame, 1998

Partial works
Almanacs

General Assembly of Rhode Island

British

Religious

Franklin & Hall

See also
 List of women printers and publishers before 1800

References

External links
Ann Franklin Documents from the Rhode Island State Archives

1696 births
1763 deaths
Colonial American women
American printers
American women journalists
People of colonial Rhode Island
People from colonial Boston
History of women in the United States
Franklin family
Women printers
18th-century American women writers
18th-century American businesspeople
18th-century American businesswomen
Burials at Common Burying Ground and Island Cemetery